A blood product is any therapeutic substance prepared from human blood. This includes whole blood; blood components; and plasma derivatives. Whole blood is not commonly used in transfusion medicine. Blood components include: red blood cell concentrates or suspensions; platelets produced from whole blood or via apheresis; plasma; and cryoprecipitate. Plasma derivatives are plasma proteins prepared under pharmaceutical manufacturing conditions, these include: albumin; coagulation factor concentrates; and immunoglobulins.


Relation to other substances
Blood products may also be called blood-based products to differ from blood substitutes, which generally refer to artificially produced products. Also, although many blood products have the effect of volume expansion, the group is usually distinguished from volume expanders, which generally refers to artificially produced substances and are thereby within the scope of blood substitutes.

See also
 Cryoprecipitate
 Cryosupernatant
 Fresh frozen plasma
 PF24
 Platelet transfusion
 Red blood cells

References

Blood products
Transfusion medicine